Sports Toto Malaysia Sdn Bhd is a Malaysian company, which operates in the gambling sector.

Founded and incorporated by the Malaysian Government in 1969, it was focused on the commercialisation of 4-Digits–based games. On 1 August 1985, the government in a non-tender privatisation, sold the company to businessman Vincent Tan who merged it into his Berjaya Group. One another lottery that fall in 4D is called Magnum 4D

Today, Sports Toto is a wholly owned subsidiary of Berjaya Sports Toto Berhad, which is listed on the main market of Bursa Malaysia. It claims to be the largest operator in Malaysia of 4D-based games, with 680 sales outlets offering a total of 7 games.

References

External links

Company website
1969 establishments in Malaysia
Gambling companies of Malaysia
Berjaya Corporation
Entertainment companies established in 1969